Allan Eric Funk (born July 7, 1971) is an American professional wrestler who has previously worked in promotions such as World Championship Wrestling and Total Nonstop Action Wrestling, often with comedic personas. He also competed in Lucha Libre USA as Chi Chi.

Professional wrestling career

World Championship Wrestling
Funk first appeared in World Championship Wrestling (WCW) under his real name, wrestling on Saturday Night and WorldWide against opponents such as Sonny Siaki. Soon after his debut, Funk had a brief feud with Barry Horowitz, he then teamed with "Above Average" Mike Sanders, as the Re-Enforcers. The team dissolved after both men got brought to WCW Monday Nitro.

Upon his graduation from the WCW Power Plant in 1998, Funk was moved up to the main roster and given a left field gimmick as an eccentric dressed all in pink, and given the ring name Kwee Wee. Contrary to popular belief, Kwee Wee was not a homosexual, as demonstrated by his physical interactions with manager Paisley.
Near the end of WCW's existence, Kwee Wee developed an aggressive alter-ego named "Angry Allan", whom Kwee Wee would suddenly "turn into" during a match, a gimmick similar to Dr. Jekyll and Mr. Hyde or The Incredible Hulk. He feuded with Prince Iaukea, Elix Skipper and The Natural Born Thrillers.

Kwee Wee appeared in the final WCW pay-per-view Greed on March 18, 2001 in a losing effort against Jason Jett.

He was signed by the WWE after the 2001 WCW buyout, but was never featured on WWE television and was released in December 2001.

He then appeared in World Wrestling All-Stars as "The Funkster", an impression of "The Hulkster" Hulk Hogan.

Total Nonstop Action Wrestling

Funk joined Total Nonstop Action Wrestling (TNA) on June 19, 2002 as Bruce, a "homosexual" gimmick, forming a short-lived tag team with Lenny Lane known as The Rainbow Express. The team split on November 20, 2002. Bruce also won the Miss TNA Championship on July 31, 2002.

Independents
On September 27, 2003 at the Baltic Brawl event in Helsinki, Finland, Funk wrestled a tag team match with Mike Sanders against Elix Skipper and Sonny Siaki. During that match, Siaki botched a split-legged moonsault and landed on Funk's face knee-first. Funk was badly injured, breaking his eardrum, nose and jaw, also cracking his orbital bone. He has had four surgeries to repair the damage and is still 100% deaf in his left ear, but he made an otherwise full recovery.

Funk resumed wrestling on the independent circuit in 2005, including an appearance in Vince Russo's Ring of Glory promotion as Queen Herod. He also wrestled numerous matches in the NWA Anarchy/Wildside promotion in Cornelia, Georgia.

All Japan Pro Wrestling
Funk made his debut in All Japan Pro Wrestling. He had matches with The Great Muta, Kaz Hayashi, Kojima, Taiyo Kea and Kawada. He teamed up with Jerry Tuite, Elix Skipper, Kea and Mike Awesome.

Lucha Libre USA: Masked Warriors
In July 2010, Funk began working under the name Chi Chi of the Exótico division for MTV2's wrestling TV project Lucha Libre USA: Masked Warriors, playing a parody of Lady Gaga. He made his debut on the first episode on July 16 along with his best friend Tigresa Caliente.

Championships and accomplishments
Total Nonstop Action Wrestling
Miss TNA (1 time)
Other titles
BTW Ohio Tag Team Championship (1 time)

See also
 List of exóticos

References

External links
Online World of Wrestling profile 

1971 births
American male professional wrestlers
LGBT characters in professional wrestling
Living people
People from Alliance, Ohio
Exóticos
21st-century LGBT people